Soup is a primarily liquid food.

Soup may also refer to:

Arts and entertainment

Film and television
The Soup (film), a 2017 South Korean film
Soup (TV series), a New Zealand children's claymation series
The Soup, an American television show
"The Soup" (Seinfeld), a 1994 episode

Literature
Soup (novel), a 1974 children's novel by Robert Newton Peck

Music
Soup (band), a Norwegian progressive post-rock band
Soup (rapper), American rapper, founding member of Jurassic 5
Soup (Blind Melon album), 1995
Soup (The Housemartins and the Beautiful South album), 2007
Soup (Otomo Yoshihide, Bill Laswell and Yasuhiro Yoshigaki album), 2003
Soup EP, by A Will Away, 2019

Computing
Soup (Apple), a file system for the Apple Newton platform
Software of unknown pedigree, used in various American and British standards concerning software system certification
Soup.io, a social networking and microblogging site

Nickname
Soup Cable (1913–1995), American basketball player
Bill Campbell (baseball) (born 1948), American baseball player
Dave Campbell (infielder) (born 1942), American baseball player and broadcaster
Eric Campbell (baseball) (born 1987), American baseball player
Soup Campbell (1915–2000), American baseball player
Jeff Suppan (born 1975), American baseball player

See also
Soupy (disambiguation)
Supe (disambiguation)

Lists of people by nickname